Lisa Berry  (born November 6, 1979) is a Canadian actress, seen regularly on television with appearances in The Colony, Northpole: Open for Christmas, Combat Hospital, Bad Blood, Shadowhunters: The Mortal Instruments, 19-2 and Supernatural.

Early life 
Berry was born in Richmond Hill, Ontario. She attended the Randolph Academy for the Performing Arts, graduating in 2004, returning on occasion to encourage students in their learning.
The Canadian actress started her career in the entertainment industry as a make-up artist before getting her big break as an actress.

Career
In 2012, Berry played the role of clinic receptionist in the sci-fi thriller  Antiviral which won the "Best Canadian First Feature Film" at the 2012 Toronto International Film Festival (TIFF).
In 2013, Lisa Berry starred as Nara in the Netflix film The Colony  alongside Laurence Fishburne and Bill Paxton. Some of the highlights of Berry's extensive career include playing Captain Pam Everwood, RN in twelve episodes of the 2011 television series Combat Hospital, and the 2015 films No Stranger Than Love , and Northpole: Open for Christmas.

In 2019, Berry appeared as Detective Roberta Hanson in eight episodes of Slasher. From 2015-2020, Berry had a recurring role as Billie the Reaper (and the Death) for fourteen episodes of Supernatural alongside Jensen Ackles and Jared Padalecki. 

Berry has also appeared in commercials for the Nintendo Wii, Walmart and Quaker Oats.

Awards and nominations
Trailblazer Award, Reel World Film Festival 
Best Ensemble Dora Mavor Moore Award Nomination for your work in Young Peoples Theatre production of `To Kill A Mockingbird’.
Nominated for a Best Actress Award for the Black Canadian Awards in Toronto.
Berry was part of the winning cast of  Antiviral  which won the "Best Canadian First Feature Film" at the 2012 Toronto International Film Festival.
RCPA Alumni of Distinction Award 2017

Filmography

Film

TV Movie

Television series

References

External links

Lisa Berry - twitter
Lisa Berry - Instagram
Lisa Berry website

Living people
21st-century Canadian actresses
Canadian television actresses
Canadian film actresses
Actresses from Ontario
People from Richmond Hill, Ontario
Randolph College for the Performing Arts alumni
1979 births
Black Canadian actresses